Dattatraya Chandrashekhar Patil Revoor, also known as, Appu Gouda Patil, is an Indian politician and who is the current president of Kalyana-Karnataka Region Development Board and Member of Legislative Assembly from Kalaburagi South Constituency since 2013.

Early life and education
Dattatraya C. Patil Revoor was born in Kalaburagi. He is the son of  Chandrashekar Patil Revoor ex MLA of Gulbarga Dakshina.

Positions held 
Zilla Panchayat Member, Kalaburagi 
Member Of Legislative Assembly Kalaburagi South (2013)
National Secretary BJP YUVA MORCHA 
Member Of Legislative Assembly Kalaburagi South (2018)
Chairman Kalyan Karnataka Regional Development Board (2020)
2018

References

Living people
People from  Kalaburagi district
Bharatiya Janata Party politicians from Karnataka
1983 births
Karnataka MLAs 2013–2018
Karnataka MLAs 2018–2023